Hypsotropa vulneratella is a species of snout moth in the genus Hypsotropa. It was described by Zeller in 1847, and is known from Syria, Croatia, France, Spain, Portugal, Sardinia and Sicily.

References

Moths described in 1847
Anerastiini
Moths of Europe
Moths of Asia